SDB or sdb may refer to:

 Subdwarf B star (sdB)

Organizations
 Salesians of Don Bosco, a Roman Catholic religious order
 Seventh Day Baptist, a Christian denomination
 Social Democratic League (Sociaal Democratische Bond), a Dutch socialist political party
 Society for Developmental Biology
 State Security Administration, Yugoslav secret police
 State Security Service, Serbian secret police
 Surat Diamond Bourse, India

Military
 SDB (Strategicheskiy Dahl'niy Bombardirovshchik – strategic long-range bomber), Myasishchev M-4
 GBU-39 Small Diameter Bomb or GBU-53/B, guided bomb
 Service Dress Blue (SDB), a uniform of the United States Navy
 Seaward Defence Boat

Computing
 sdb (debugger) (Symbolic Debugger), Unix
 /dev/sdb, the second SCSI, SATA or USB disk